Andrey Leonidovich Medyansky (born January 14, 1963) is a Russian professional association football manager and a former player currently managing FC Nika Moscow.

As a player, he played two seasons in the Soviet Top League for FC Pakhtakor Tashkent.

External links
Career summary by KLISF

1963 births
Living people
Soviet footballers
Russian footballers
Russian football managers
Pakhtakor Tashkent FK players
Association football defenders